Nathalie Dupree (born December 23, 1939, in New Jersey) is an author, chef, and cooking show host whose work has focused on American Southern cuisine. She was the first woman since Julia Child to host more than one hundred cooking episodes on public television. Her first show, New Southern Cooking with Nathalie Dupree was followed by eight more series.

Dupree is the author of 14 cookbooks, selling nearly a million copies, and the host of more than 300 national and international cooking shows, which have aired since 1986 on PBS, The Food Network, and The Learning Channel. She has appeared many times on the Today show and Good Morning America. She has won wide recognition for her work, including four James Beard Awards including "Who's who in American Cuisine", Grande Dame of Les Dames d' Escoffier and numerous other awards. She is best known for starting the New Southern Cooking movement now found in many restaurants throughout the United States.  She has been chef in three restaurants, in Majorca, Spain; Georgia; and Virginia. For 10 years she directed the Rich's Cooking School in Atlanta, with more than 10,000 students. Many of them have gone on to careers in restaurants, cooking publishing, and food media.

Dupree is the daughter of Walter G. Meyer and Evelyn Kreiser. After her parents divorced she grew up in the American South with her mother and two siblings. In the late 1960s Nathalie and her second husband, David Dupree, lived in London, where Nathalie attended Le Cordon Bleu cooking school, earning an advanced certificate. Following graduation she operated a restaurant in Majorca. Returning to the United States, she and David settled in David's home town, Social Circle, Georgia, where she established Nathalie's restaurant.

She is a founder and two-time president of the International Association of Culinary Professionals, founder and co-president of both the Atlanta and Charleston, South Chapters of Les Dames d' Escoffier, founding chairman of the Charleston Food and Wine Festival, past president of the Atlanta Chapter of the International Woman's Forum and is active in many other organizations.

Dupree mounted a write-in campaign against incumbent Senator Jim DeMint in the 2010 Senate election in South Carolina.  She sought DeMint's seat as a long shot, seeking to "cook his goose."  She expressed a willingness to work alongside fellow South Carolina Senator Lindsey Graham to "bring home the bacon" for the state.

References

External links
NathalieDupree.com
 Nathalie Dupree archive at the University of South Carolina Irvin Department of Rare Books and Special Collections.
nathalie.com 
 

Living people
American food writers
American television chefs
Women in South Carolina politics
1939 births
Alumni of Le Cordon Bleu
People from Social Circle, Georgia
Writers from Charleston, South Carolina
Women food writers
Women cookbook writers
American women chefs
James Beard Foundation Award winners
21st-century American women